Mehmed I ( 1386 – 26 May 1421), also known as Mehmed Çelebi ("the noble-born") or Kirişçi ("lord's son"),  was the Ottoman sultan from 1413 to 1421. The fourth son of Sultan Bayezid I and Devlet Hatun, he fought with his brothers over control of the Ottoman realm in the Ottoman Interregnum (1402–1413). Starting from the province of Rûm he managed to bring first Anatolia and then the European territories (Rumelia) under his control, reuniting the Ottoman state by 1413, and ruling it until his death in 1421. Called "The Restorer," he reestablished central authority in Anatolia, and he expanded the Ottoman presence in Europe by the conquest of Wallachia in 1415. Venice destroyed his fleet off Gallipoli in 1416 as the Ottomans lost a naval war.

Early life
Mehmed was born in 1386 or 1387 as the fourth son of Sultan Bayezid I and one of his consorts, the slave girl Devlet Hatun. Following Ottoman custom, when he reached adolescence in 1399, he was sent to gain experience as provincial governor over the Rûm Eyalet (central northern Anatolia), recently conquered from its Eretnid rulers.

On 20 July 1402, his father Bayezid was defeated in the Battle of Ankara by the Turko-Mongol conqueror and ruler Timur. The brothers (with the exception of Mustafa, who was captured and taken along with Bayezid to Samarkand) were rescued from the battlefield, Mehmed being saved by Bayezid Pasha, who took him to his hometown of Amasya. Mehmed later made Bayezid Pasha his grand vizier (1413–1421).

The early Ottoman Empire had no regulated succession, and according to Turkish tradition, every son could succeed his father. Of Mehmed's brothers, the eldest, Ertuğrul, had died in 1400, while the next in line, Mustafa, was a prisoner of Timur. Leaving aside the underage siblings, this left four princes—Mehmed, Süleyman, İsa, and Musa, to contend over control of the remaining Ottoman territories in the civil war known as the "Ottoman Interregnum". In modern historiography, these princes are usually called by the title Çelebi, but in contemporary sources, the title is reserved for Mehmed and Musa. The Byzantine sources translated the title as Kyritzes (Κυριτζής), which was in turn adopted into Turkish as kirişçi, sometimes misinterpreted as güreşçi, "the wrestler".

During the early interregnum, Mehmed Çelebi behaved as Timur's vassal. Beside the other princes, Mehmed minted coin which Timur's name appeared as "Demur han Gürgân" (تيمور خان كركان), alongside his own as "Mehmed bin Bayezid han" (محمد بن بايزيد خان). This was probably an attempt on Mehmed's part to justify to Timur his conquest of Bursa after the Battle of Ulubad. After Mehmed established himself in Rum, Timur had already begun preparations for his return to Central Asia, and took no further steps to interfere with the status quo in Anatolia.

Reign
After winning the Interregnum, Mehmed crowned himself sultan in the Thracian city of Edirne that lay in the European part of the empire (the area dividing the Anatolian and European sides of the empire, Constantinople and the surrounding region, was still held by the Byzantine Empire), becoming Mehmed I. He consolidated his power, made Edirne the most important of the dual capitals, and conquered parts of Albania, the Jandarid emirate, and the Armenian Kingdom of Cilicia from the Mamluks. Taking his many achievements into consideration, Mehmed is widely known as the "second founder" of the Ottoman Sultanate.

Soon after Mehmed began his reign, his brother Mustafa Çelebi, who had originally been captured along with their father Bayezid I during the Battle of Ankara and held captive in Samarkand, hiding in Anatolia during the Interregnum, reemerged and asked Mehmed to partition the empire with him. Mehmed refused and met Mustafa's forces in battle, easily defeating them. Mustafa escaped to the Byzantine city of Thessaloniki, but after an agreement with Mehmed, the Byzantine emperor Manuel II Palaiologos exiled Mustafa to the island of Lemnos.

However, Mehmed still faced some problems, first being the problem of his nephew Orhan, who Mehmed perceived as a threat to his rule, much like his late brothers had been. There was allegedly a plot involving him by Manuel II Palaiologos, who tried to use Orhan against Sultan Mehmed; however, the sultan found out about the plot and had Orhan blinded for betrayal, according to a common Byzantine practice.

Furthermore, as a result of the Battle of Ankara and other civil wars, the population of the empire had become unstable and traumatized. A very powerful social and religious movement arose in the empire and became disruptive. The movement was led by Sheikh Bedreddin (1359–1420), a famous Muslim Sufi and charismatic theologian. He was an eminent Ulema, born of a Greek mother and a Muslim father in Simavna (Kyprinos) southwest of Edirne (formerly Adrianople). Mehmed's brother Musa had made Bedreddin his "qadi of the army," or the supreme judge. Bedreddin created a populist religious movement in the Ottoman Sultanate, "subversive conclusions promoting the suppression of social differences between rich and poor as well as the barriers between different forms of monotheism." Successfully developing a popular social revolution and syncretism of the various religions and sects of the empire, Bedreddin's movement began in the European side of the empire and underwent further expansion in western Anatolia.

In 1416, Sheikh Bedreddin started his rebellion against the throne. After a four-year struggle, he was finally captured by Mehmed's grand vizier Bayezid Pasha and hanged in the city of Serres, a city in modern-day Greece, in 1420.

Death

The reign of Mehmed I as sultan of the re-united empire lasted only eight years before his death, but he had also been the most powerful brother contending for the throne and de facto ruler of most of the empire for nearly the whole preceding period of 11 years of the Ottoman Interregnum that passed between his father's captivity at Ankara and his own final victory over his brother Musa Çelebi at the Battle of Çamurlu.

Before his death, to secure passing the throne safely to his son Murad II, Mehmed blinded his nephew Orhan Çelebi (son of Süleyman), and decided to send his two sons Yusuf and Mahmud to be held as a hostage by Emperor Manuel II, hoping to ensure the continuing custody of his brother Mustafa.

He was buried in Bursa, in a mausoleum erected by himself near the celebrated mosque which he built there, and which, because of its decorations of green glazed tiles, is called the Green Mosque. Mehmed I also completed another mosque in Bursa, which his grandfather Murad I had commenced but which had been neglected during the reign of Bayezid. Mehmed founded in the vicinity of his own Green Mosque and mausoleum two other characteristic institutions, one a school and one a refectory for the poor, both of which he endowed with royal munificence.

Family

Consorts
Mehmed I had three known consorts:
Emine Hatun. Daughter of Nasireddin Mehmed Bey, fifth ruler of Dulkadirids. She married Mehmed in 1403 and according to tradition she was the mother of Murad II. Her niece Sittişah Hatun would later marry Mehmed II.
Şahzade Hatun. Daughter of Dividdar Ahmed Pasha, third ruler of Kutluşah of Canik. According to some historians, she was the real mother of Murad II.
 Kumru Hatun. Slave concubine.

Sons
Mehmed I had at least five sons:
 Murad II (1404 - 1451) - with Emine Hatun or Şahzade Hatun. Sultan of the Ottoman Empire. 
 Mustafa Çelebi, known as Küçük Mustafa (1408 - 1423) 
 Mahmud Çelebi (1413 - August 1429. Buried in the mausoleum's Mehmed I, Bursa) 
 Yusuf Çelebi (1414 - August 1429. Buried in the mausoleum's Mehmed I, Bursa) 
 Ahmed Çelebi. Died in infancy.

Daughters
Mehmed I had at least seven daughters:
Selçuk Hatun ( 1407 - 25 October 1485, buried in Mehmed I Mausoleum, Bursa) - with Kumru Hatun. She married Taceddin Ibrahim II Bey, ruler of Isfendiyarids (1392 – 30 May 1443), son of Prince İsfendiyar Bey, ruler of Isfendiyarids. They had three sons and three daughters, all died in infancy except a daughter, Hatice Hanzade Hatun. After widowed, she married Anadolu Beylerbeyi Karaca. They had a daughter.
Ilaldi Sultan Hatun (? - 1444). She married Prince Damat Ibrahim II Bey, ruler of Karamanids (died 16 July 1464), son of Prince Mehmed II Bey (son of Nefise Hatun, a Murad I's daughter), and had six sons. One of them, Kaya Bey, married his cousin Hafsa Hatun, daughter of Murad II. 
Hatice Hatun (1408 - 1442). She married to Karaca Paşah (died 10 November 1444).
Hafsa Hatun (? - 1445, buried in Mehmed I Mausoleum, Bursa). She married Mahmud Bey (died January 1444), son of Çandarlı Halil Pasha.
Incu Hatun. She married to Isa Bey (died 1437), son of Prince Damat Mehmed II Bey. 
 Ayşe Hatun (1412 - 1469, buried in Mehmed I Mausoleum, Bursa). She married to Damat Alaattin Ali Bey, ruler of Karamanids, son Prince Mehmed II Bey.
Şahzade Sitti Hatun (1413 - ?, buried in Mehmed I Mausoleum, Bursa). In 1427 she married Sinan Paşah (d. 1442).

References

Sources

Further reading
 Harris, Jonathan, The End of Byzantium. New Haven and London: Yale University Press, 2010.

External links 

15th-century Ottoman sultans
People of the Ottoman Interregnum
1421 deaths
1386 births
15th-century people from the Ottoman Empire